This page describe all the 2004 seasons of Formula Renault series.

Formula Renault 3.5L

Formula Renault 2.0L

2004 Formula Renault 2000 Eurocup season

2004 Championnat de France Formula Renault 2.0 season

2004 Formula Renault 2000 UK season
All races held in United Kingdom. Mike Conway won the championship title.

2004 Formula Renault 2000 UK Winter Series

2004 Formula Renault BARC season

2004 Formula Renault 2000 Italia season

2004 Formula Renault 2000 Italia Winter Series

2004 Formula Renault 2000 Germany season

2004 Formula Renault 2000 Netherlands season

2004 Formula Renault 2000 Scandinavia season

2004 Renault Speed Trophy F2000 season
Point system: 25, 22, 20, 18, 16, 14, 12, 10, 8, 6, 5, 4, 3, 2, 1 for 15th. 1 point for fastest lap and 1 pont for pole position.

Some venues include non Suisse drivers who not compete for the final standing. These drivers aren't included in the following result table.

2004 Copa Corona Formula Renault 2000 de America season
Point system : 30, 24, 20, 16, 12, 10, 8, 6, 4, 2 for 10th. Extra 2 points for Fastest lap and 2 points for Pole position.

2004 Formula Renault 2.0 Brazil season
Point system : 30, 24, 20, 16, 12, 10, 8, 6, 4, 2 for 10th. One point for Pole position and one point for Fastest lap were also distributed.

Galid Osman Didi, Jr. finish first in the Category B Championship with 60 points behind William Starostik (24pts).

(R) = Rookie championship
(B) = Category B Championship

2004 Formula Renault 2000 Mexico season

2004 Formula TR 2000 Pro Series Winter Series

2004 Asian Formula Renault Challenge season

Formula Renault 1.6L

2004 Championnat de France FFSA Formule Campus Renault Elf season
Point system : ?
All drivers use the La Fillière car. The calendar include 7 venues in various French circuits.

2004 Formula Renault 1600 Belgium season
Point system : ?

2004 Formula Renault 1.6 Spain season

2004 Formula Renault Monza season
The season was held over 8 races in Italia.
Point system : 20, 17, 15, 13, 11, 10, 9, 8, 7, 6, 5, 4, 3, 2, 1 for 15th. Extra 1 point for Fastest lap and 2 points for Pole position.

2004 Formula Renault Elf 1.6 Argentina season
Point system : 20, 15, 12, 10, 8, 6, 4, 3, 2, 1 for 10th. 1 extra point for Pole position. 1 point for start in each race.

2004 Formula TR 1600 Pro Series season
The Formula TR 1600 Pro Series is held with the Formula TR 2000 Pro Series. The same point system is used.

Other Formulas powered by Renault championships
This section resume unofficial and/or renault engine supplier formula serie.

2004 Fórmula Super Renault season
Ivo Perabó won the championship.

References

Renault
Formula Renault seasons